Privilege Chesa (born 6 December 2000) is a Zimbabwean cricketer. In December 2020, he was named in the Southern Rocks' squad for the 2020–21 Logan Cup. He made his Twenty20 debut on 14 April 2021, for Rocks, in the 2020–21 Zimbabwe Domestic Twenty20 Competition.

Prior to his Twenty20 debut, he was named in Zimbabwe's squad for the 2020 Under-19 Cricket World Cup. In Zimbabwe's 11th place play-off match against Scotland, Chesa took a five-wicket haul, and was named the player of the match. He made his List A debut on 20 April 2021, for Rocks, in the 2020–21 Pro50 Championship. He made his first-class debut on 25 January 2022, for Rocks in the 2021–22 Logan Cup in Zimbabwe.

References

External links
 

2000 births
Living people
Zimbabwean cricketers
Southern Rocks cricketers
Place of birth missing (living people)